City Lights is a Scottish television sitcom made by BBC Scotland and set in Glasgow. It ran from 1984 to 1991 (networked 1987 to 1991) and was written by Bob Black. Two stage shows, featuring the original cast, toured Scotland.

Premise
It starred Gerard Kelly as Willie Melvin, a bank-teller at the fictional Strathclyde Savings Bank (whose logo was very similar to the TSB), with dreams of becoming a novelist. Most of the plots revolved around his attempts to get his book, the autobiographical My Childhood Up A Close, published, however his efforts are continually thwarted by both his own incompetence and overall gullibility. He also occasionally gets involved in the antics of best friend Chancer Andy Gray, who has a penchant for get-rich-quick schemes and dodgy dealings that backfire, and Willie often gets caught up in the resulting mess.  None of this ingratiates Willie with his long suffering boss and bank manager McLelland (who is always looking for an excuse to fire him), and constantly exasperates his Mum Jan Wilson.

Cast and characters
He was held back in this by his own incompetence, the dodgy dealings of his best friend Chancer (Andy Gray), and the lack of support he gained from his mother (Jan Wilson), the bank's manager Adam McLelland (Dave Anderson) and his obsequious fellow teller, Brian (Jonathan Watson). Other recurring characters included Chancer's friend Tam (Iain McColl) and Willie's love interests, Janice (Elaine Collins, Series 1 and 2) and Fiona (Ann Bryson, Series 4 and 5).

Billy Connolly guest-starred in one episode.

References

External links
 Comedy Guide
 
 City Lights at British TV Resources

1984 Scottish television series debuts
1991 Scottish television series endings
BBC Scotland television shows
BBC television sitcoms
Scottish television sitcoms
Television shows set in Glasgow
1980s Scottish television series
1990s Scottish television series
English-language television shows
1980s British sitcoms
1990s British sitcoms